Elston Grove Historic District can refer to either of two historic districts in the U.S. state of Indiana:

Elston Grove Historic District (Crawfordsville, Indiana)
Elston Grove Historic District (Michigan City, Indiana)